Tsvetozar Viktorov (born 11 February 1963) is a Bulgarian bobsledder. He competed at the 1988, 1992 and the 1994 Winter Olympics.

References

1963 births
Living people
Bulgarian male bobsledders
Olympic bobsledders of Bulgaria
Bobsledders at the 1988 Winter Olympics
Bobsledders at the 1992 Winter Olympics
Bobsledders at the 1994 Winter Olympics
Sportspeople from Pernik Province